Pilcaya is a town and municipal seat of the Municipality of Pilcaya in the state of Guerrero, Mexico, located  from Mexico City,  from Cuernavaca,  from Toluca,  from Taxco and  from Ixtapan de la Sal. The name "Pilcaya" is from the Nahuatl word pilcacyan, place of a hanging object.

Town
Pilcaya is mainly an agricultural town with a population of 4,899. Its main agricultural activity is the cultivation of gladiola flowers which growers sell in nearby Tenancingo and Mexico City. There is also a recent surge in the building of greenhouses which mainly grow tomatoes for the domestic market.

Landmarks
Sanctuary of La Imaculada Concepción, whose construction was initiated in 1650 and is still in use.
Parque Nacional Grutas de Cacahuamilpa

Municipality
As municipal seat, Pilcaya has governing jurisdiction over the following communities: La Concepcion, Cacahuamilpa, El Mogote, El Sauz, Crucero de Grutas, El Platanar, Juchimilpa, El Bosque, Nombre de Dios, Los Sauces, Santa Maria, Chimaltitlan, Amatitlan, Cuitlapa, El Uvalar, Tecuanipa, Chichila, Piedras Negras, El Transformador, and Santa Teresa. The population of the municipality of Pilcaya is 10,050 as of 2005. The municipality of Pilcaya is the only municipality in Guerrero to border both the state of Mexico and the state of Morelos. It borders the municipio of Ixtapan, Tonatico, Zumpahuacán, Coatepec Harinas and Zacualpan in state of Mexico to the north and west. To the east it borders Coatlan del Rio in the state of Morelos. And to the south it borders Taxco and Tetipac both in the Guerrero state. The population of the municipality as of 2005 was 10,851.

References

Populated places in Guerrero